Gordon Rodgers (born 1952 in Gander, Newfoundland) is a Canadian writer.

Biography
Rodgers is the author of two books of poetry: Floating Houses (1984), and The Pyrate Latitudes (1986), as well as a novella entitled The Phoenix (1985). In 1999, he released his first novel, A Settlement of Memory, which is loosely based on the life of William Coaker. He obtained his MFA in Creative Writing from the University of British Columbia, and an MSc from Memorial University of Newfoundland.

He was a clinical psychologist, (retired 2016) and was a part-time lecturer with the Faculty of Medicine of Memorial University of Newfoundland.

Personal
Rodgers lives in Paradise, Newfoundland and Labrador, with his wife Paula, and is working on his second novel.

He has two sons, David, a lawyer in St. John’s, NL and Christopher, a computer engineer in St. John’s.

External links
Biography on Creative Book Publishing
Personnel of the Faculty of Medicine with Rodgers listed under Psychiatry

References

20th-century Canadian poets
Canadian male poets
Canadian male novelists
Writers from Newfoundland and Labrador
People from Gander, Newfoundland and Labrador
Living people
People from Mount Pearl
1952 births
20th-century Canadian male writers